Kevin John Hogan (born 11 August 1963) is an Australian politician. He has been a Nationals member of the Australian House of Representatives, representing the Division of Page in New South Wales, since September 2013.

Early life
Hogan was born in Port Augusta in regional South Australia. After completing a Bachelor of Economics at Flinders University in 1984, he began a career in finance. He moved to Sydney and worked for an official money market dealer, GIO Securities, dealing with the Reserve Bank of Australia on a daily basis. Hogan then went on to work with Colonial State Bank for ten years. In this role he managed a multibillion-dollar portfolio and appeared on Sky News every morning giving an economic update.
Hogan married his wife Karen in 1993. They returned to Karen's home town of Lismore in 1998. He then completed a Graduate Diploma in Education in 1998 at Southern Cross University. He took up a position at St Mary's High School in Casino where he taught Business Studies and Commerce from 1999 until 2006.
Hogan has also been a director of the industry superannuation fund Catholic Superannuation Retirement Fund, and was their investment officer from 2006 for a number of years.
He then operated his own consultancy business and runs a small cattle property outside Lismore.

Career
Hogan ran as the Nationals candidate for the Division of Page at the 2010 election, but was defeated by the incumbent Australian Labor Party candidate Janelle Saffin. He re-contested the bellwether seat at the 2013 election and campaigned heavily on cost of living issues, jobs and the duplication of the Pacific Highway. He secured a two-party-preferred swing of 6.7 points – almost twice the national average of 3.6 points, finishing with a margin of 2.5 points. The redistribution before the 2016 election saw Kevin re-elected. Upon entering Australia's 44th Federal Parliament as a member of the Coalition government, Hogan was appointed to the Finance Select Committee where, at its first meeting, he urged Australian Reserve Bank Governor Glenn Stevens to consider appointing a regional representative to the 11-member interest-rate setting board.
Hogan has served on Lismore City Council’s Wastewater Advisory Committee, was vice-president of his local state primary school Parents & Citizens Committee, and has coached junior sporting teams.

On 26 March 2018, the House of Representatives elected Hogan as Deputy Speaker.

Following Peter Dutton's unsuccessful attempt to oust Malcolm Turnbull as leader of the Liberal Party and Prime Minister, Hogan announced that he would move to the crossbench if the Liberals called for another spill before the next election. He made good on his promise on 24 August, when Turnbull resigned the leadership rather than face a second spill, which resulted in Scott Morrison becoming Prime Minister. Hogan called himself an "Independent National"; while he sat on the crossbench, he continued to support the Coalition on confidence and supply matters, and remained in the National party room. Nationals leader and Deputy Prime Minister Michael McCormack said that Hogan remained a member of the Nationals in good standing. McCormack also stated that Hogan would have the Nationals' full support if he sought reelection as a National at the next federal election.

With Hogan's move to the crossbench and Turnbull's subsequent retirement from politics, the Coalition was reduced to a minority government with 74 out of 150 seats. The Coalition remained in minority government after the ensuing by-election saw Wentworth taken by independent Kerryn Phelps. As a result, the Coalition needed the votes of Hogan and the five crossbenchers to remain in office.

Hogan sought reelection as a National in 2019, and was reelected with a healthy swing of seven percent, enough to technically make Page a safe National seat. In a statement published on his own website on 21 May 2019, Hogan announced that he was returning to the Coalition benches, saying that he was satisfied that rule changes in the Liberal Party to discourage challenges to sitting Prime Ministers would end the instability that had caused him to withdraw from the Coalition in protest, and that the recent election results showed that the public wanted a Coalition government.

In February 2020, Hogan was promoted to the Morrison Ministry as the Assistant Minister to the Deputy Prime Minister. Llew O'Brien was elected to replace him as the Deputy Speaker of the House on 10 February 2020.

External links
 Official website

References

 

1963 births
Living people
National Party of Australia members of the Parliament of Australia
Members of the Australian House of Representatives for Page
Members of the Australian House of Representatives
People from Port Augusta
21st-century Australian politicians